Zoran Krečković (born April 17, 1959) is a Serbian professional basketball coach and former player.

Coaching career 
Krečković began his coaching career in 1996 with IMT Beopetrol in Belgrade. In February 2000 he got fired. He had a stint at Crvena zvezda in 2001–02 before moving on to Yamolgaz '92 Yambol in the Bulgarian League from 2002–03.

Krečković coached the Kuwait national team from 2004–06 and in 2008–09, including appearances in the 2005 FIBA Asia Championship in Doha and the 2009 Asia Championship in Tianjin, China.

He guided Al Sadd in the 2011–12 Qatari League season and got second position in the league and Emir Cup title in that season. Krečković had a stint at Osaka Evessa of Japan League in 2012. After that he coached Al Jahraa in Kuwaiti League for two seasons.

In 2014, Krečković became a head coach of Al Sadd for second time. In July 2018, he became a head coach of Al Jahraa for second time.

Career achievements 
As player
 FIBA Korać Cup winner: 1 (with Partizan: 1977–78)
 Yugoslav Cup winner: 1 (with IMT: 1986–87)

As head coach
 Emir of Qatar Cup winner: 1 (with Al Sadd: 2011–12)

Head coaching record

|-
| style="text-align:left;"|Osaka Evessa
| style="text-align:left;"|2012
| 4||0||4|||| style="text-align:center;"|Fired|||-||-||-||
| style="text-align:center;"|- 
|-

See also 
 List of KK Crvena zvezda head coaches
 KK Partizan all-time roster

References

External links
 Zoran Kreckovic at eurobasket.com

1959 births
Kreckovic, Zoran
KK IMT Beograd players
KK Partizan players
KK Beopetrol/Atlas Beograd coaches
KK Crvena zvezda head coaches
Osaka Evessa coaches
Serbian men's basketball coaches
Serbian men's basketball players
Serbian expatriate basketball people in Bulgaria
Serbian expatriate basketball people in Japan
Serbian expatriate basketball people in Kuwait
Serbian expatriate basketball people in Qatar
Shooting guards
Yugoslav men's basketball players